Gamasomorpha is a genus of goblin spiders in the family Oonopidae, containing sixty three accepted species.

Species

 Gamasomorpha anhuiensis Song & Xu, 1984 — China
 Gamasomorpha arabica Simon, 1893 — Middle East
 Gamasomorpha asterobothrus Eichenberger, 2011 — Sumatra
 Gamasomorpha austera Simon, 1898 — Seychelles
 Gamasomorpha australis Hewitt, 1915 — South Africa
 Gamasomorpha barbifera Tong & Li, 2007 — China
 Gamasomorpha bipeltis (Thorell, 1895) — Myanmar
 Gamasomorpha brasiliana Bristowe, 1938 — Brazil
 Gamasomorpha camelina Simon, 1893 — Singapore
 Gamasomorpha cataphracta Karsch, 1881 — Korea, Taiwan, Japan, Philippines
 Gamasomorpha clarki Hickman, 1950 — Australia
 Gamasomorpha clypeolaria Simon, 1907 — India
 Gamasomorpha comosa Tong & Li, 2009 — China
 Gamasomorpha coniacris Eichenberger, 2011 — Malaysia, Bintan Islands
 Gamasomorpha deksam Saaristo & van Harten, 2002 — Socotra
 Gamasomorpha fricki Eichenberger, 2011 — Vietnam
 Gamasomorpha gershomi Saaristo, 2007 — Israel
 Gamasomorpha humicola Lawrence, 1947 — South Africa
 Gamasomorpha humilis Mello-Leitão, 1920 — Brazil
 Gamasomorpha inclusa (Thorell, 1887) — Myanmar
 Gamasomorpha insomnia Eichenberger, 2011 — Thailand, Malaysia
 Gamasomorpha insularis Simon, 1907 — Madeira, Bioko, São Tomé, St. Helena, Mauritius, Yemen, Seychelles
 Gamasomorpha jeanneli Fage, 1936 — Kenya
 Gamasomorpha kabulensis Roewer, 1960 — Afghanistan
 Gamasomorpha keri Eichenberger, 2011 — Sumatra
 Gamasomorpha kraepelini Simon, 1905 — Java
 Gamasomorpha kusumii Komatsu, 1963 — Japan
 Gamasomorpha lalana Suman, 1965 — Hawaii, Japan
 Gamasomorpha linzhiensis Hu, 2001 — China
 Gamasomorpha longisetosa Lawrence, 1952 — South Africa
 Gamasomorpha lutzi (Petrunkevitch, 1929) — USA to Panama, West Indies
 Gamasomorpha m-scripta Birabén, 1954 — Argentina
 Gamasomorpha microps Simon, 1907 — Sri Lanka
 Gamasomorpha minima Berland, 1942 — Phoenix Islands
 Gamasomorpha mornensis Benoit, 1979 — Seychelles
 Gamasomorpha m-scripta Birabén, 1954 — Argentina
 Gamasomorpha nigrilineata Xu, 1986 — China
 Gamasomorpha nitida Simon, 1893 — Philippines
 Gamasomorpha ophiria Eichenberger, 2011 — Malaysia
 Gamasomorpha parmata (Thorell, 1890) — Sumatra, Java, Lombok
 Gamasomorpha patquiana Birabén, 1954 — Argentina
 Gamasomorpha petoteca Eichenberger, 2011 — Sumatra
 Gamasomorpha plana (Keyserling, 1883) — Peru
 Gamasomorpha platensis Birabén, 1954 — Argentina
 Gamasomorpha porcina Simon, 1909 — Vietnam
 Gamasomorpha psyllodes Thorell, 1897 — Myanmar
 Gamasomorpha puberula (Simon, 1893) — Venezuela
 Gamasomorpha pusilla Berland, 1914 — East Africa
 Gamasomorpha raya Eichenberger, 2011 — Malaysia, Bintan Islands
 Gamasomorpha rufa Banks, 1898 — Mexico
 Gamasomorpha schmilingi Eichenberger, 2011 — Malaysia, Bali
 Gamasomorpha sculptilis Thorell, 1897 — Myanmar
 Gamasomorpha semitecta Simon, 1907 — Sumatra
 Gamasomorpha servula Simon, 1908 — Western Australia
 Gamasomorpha seximpressa Simon, 1907 — Java
 Gamasomorpha silvestris (Simon, 1893) — Venezuela
 Gamasomorpha simplex (Simon, 1891) — St. Vincent
 Gamasomorpha squalens Eichenberger, 2011 — Malaysia
 Gamasomorpha subclathrata Simon, 1907 — Sri Lanka
 Gamasomorpha taprobanica Simon, 1893 — Sri Lanka
 Gamasomorpha testudinella Berland, 1914 — East Africa
 Gamasomorpha tovarensis (Simon, 1893) — Venezuela
 Gamasomorpha vianai Birabén, 1954 — Argentina
 Gamasomorpha virgulata Tong & Li, 2009 — China
 Gamasomorpha wasmanniae Mello-Leitão, 1939 — Argentina

References

Oonopidae
Araneomorphae genera
Cosmopolitan spiders